Freda Freeman-Jackson (born 1962) is an American collegiate basketball coach, who is currently the head women's basketball coach at her alma mater, Alabama State University, a position she has held since 1998. She recorded her 300th career win as coach in January 2019.

Jackson is married to former Alabama State Hornets basketball coach Lewis Jackson and their daughter Bianca currently plays for Florida State.

Head coaching record

References 

1962 births
Date of birth missing (living people)
Living people
Alabama State Lady Hornets basketball coaches
Alabama State University alumni
American women's basketball coaches
Basketball coaches from Alabama
Basketball players from Alabama
High school basketball coaches in Alabama